Jimmy Whitworth FMedSci FRCP FFPH (born September 1955) is professor of international public health at the London School of Hygiene & Tropical Medicine.

References 

Living people
1955 births
Academics of the London School of Hygiene & Tropical Medicine
Alumni of the University of Liverpool
20th-century British medical doctors
21st-century British medical doctors
Fellows of the Royal College of Physicians
British epidemiologists
British public health doctors